Events from the year 1596 in the Kingdom of Scotland.

Incumbents
Monarch – James VI

Births
Robert Spottiswood
19 August – Elizabeth Stuart, Queen of Bohemia (died 1662 in England)

Deaths
Alexander Laird Garlies Sir Stewart, aged 45
22 February – David Wemyss of That Ilk
31 May – John Lesley

See also
 Timeline of Scottish history

References